George Norris Williams (1866–1949) was the acting commissioner of Yukon from 1916 to 1918.

Notes

Commissioners of Yukon
Members of the Yukon Territorial Council
1866 births
1949 deaths